Meral Zeren is a Turkish actress whose popularity started to flourish during the early 1970s and is known to have collaborated with some well-known actors of that era.

Biography 
Meral Zeren's given birthname was Çiğdem Gümüş and although her earliest part of life had started on bad terms according to one of the widespread view that when her mother whilst being pregnant learns of her husband's polygamous affair with other woman, deserts the place where she lived with her husband(Diyarbakır) and heads to Istanbul and where Zeren gets to be born, but it seems contentious regarding other sources on her birthplace. And then, Zeren received her primary and secondary education in Istanbul, though becoming compelled to drop out of school. Yet she succeeded in making herself a place when she was just 15 had already started singing on stages and caught attention of well-known directors of that time, such as Atıf Yılmaz and Memduh Ün and they provided  her eventual introduction  into the big screen. 
Zeren's debut role in a film came from a movie named "Önce Vur sonra Sev"(1971) written by Bülent Oran and starred by lead actor Yılmaz Köksal. After that a wave of her other films got released which she  was given roles opposite to some prominent actors, like Kemal Sunal(Salako,Hanzo), Cüneyt Arkın(Yanaşma), Barış Manço(Baba bizi eversene) and others.

Selected filmography 
 1971 Önce vur sonra sev
 1971 Alaaddin'in Lambası
 1971 Battal Gazi Destanı
 1972 Battal Gazi'nin intikamı
 1972 Kanlı Para
 1972 Çöl Kartalı
 1972 Üç sevgili
 1972 Dadaloğlu'nun Intikamı
 1972 Karaoğlan Geliyor
 1973 Bitirim Kardeşler
 1973 Yanaşma
 1974 Salak Milyoner
 1974 Enayi
 1974 From the Village to the city
 1974 Salako
 1975 Hanzo
 1975 Şaşkın damat
 1975 Salak Bacılar
 1976 Nereye bakıyor bu adamlar
 1978 Aşk ve Adalet
 1980 Banker Bilo
 1984 Şaşkın Gelin
 1994 Tehlikeli Kadın
 1995 Polis dosyası
 1996 Zehirli Çiçek
 2000 Karlar Eriyince
 2001 Kardakiler
 2002 Kenar Mahalle
 2003 Sen hiç Güneşte Üşüdünmü?
 2006 Eden bulur

Accolades 
 2012, 49.Golden Orange Film Festival- Lifetime Honor award

Notes 
The place and the date of her birth are inconsistent throughout the sources.

References

Living people
20th-century Turkish actresses
Turkish film actresses
Year of birth missing (living people)